The following lists events that happened in 1980 in Iceland.

Incumbents
President – Kristján Eldjárn, Vigdís Finnbogadóttir 
Prime Minister – Benedikt Gröndal, Gunnar Thoroddsen

Events

Births

21 March – Veigar Páll Gunnarsson, footballer
10 May – Dagný Skúladóttir, handball player
22 May – Róbert Gunnarsson, handball player.
25 May – Joey Guðjónsson, footballer
20 July – Sturla Ásgeirsson, handball player.
7 October – Kristján Örn Sigurðsson, footballer
22 October – Helgi Hrafn Gunnarsson, politician
18 December – Marel Baldvinsson, footballer

Deaths
20 October – Stefán Jóhann Stefánsson, politician (b. 1894).

Full date missing
 Jón Guðmundsson, chess player (b. 1904)

References

 
1980s in Iceland
Iceland
Iceland
Years of the 20th century in Iceland